"Blame" is a song by the American post-grunge band Collective Soul. It is the third and final single from their third studio album, Disciplined Breakdown.

Charts

References

1997 singles
1997 songs
Atlantic Records singles
Collective Soul songs
Songs written by Ed Roland